Coconut is a 2007 novel by Kopano Matlwa. It tells the story of a young, black girl, and her life in Johannesburg's white suburbs. The book won the Dinaane Debut Fiction Award, and the Wole Soyinka Prize for Literature in Africa.

References

21st-century South African novels
2007 novels